X Factor was the Flemish version of the British show The X Factor, created by Simon Cowell. The new X Factor series was a successor to Idool which features contestants & jury members from both seasons.

Judges' categories and their contestants
In each season, each judge is allocated a category to mentor and chooses three acts to progress to the live shows. This table shows, for each season, which category each judge was allocated and which acts he or she put through to the live shows.

Key:
 – Winning judge/category. Winners are in bold, eliminated contestants in small font.

Series overview
 "Under 25 boys" category
 "Under 25 girls" category
 "16-24s" category
 "Over 25s" category
 "Groups" category

Season 1 (2005)
The first Belgian edition of X Factor started screening in late 2005 on vtm. The judges were Kris Wauters, Jean Blaute and Liliane Saint-Pierre; the show was hosted by Koen Wauters.

The winner of season one was Udo Mechels from Nossegem and the runner up was The Cappaert Sisters (Annelies & Sarah Cappaert) from Tongeren. Contestant Robin Danneels had to quit the show due to being hospitalized for his back pain. Therefore, Ivann could return to sing in the contest.

Key:
 – Winner
 – Runner-up
 – Third place
 – Withdrew

Results table 

Contestants' colour key:
{|
|-
| – Kris Wauter's contestants (over 25s)   
|-
| – Liliane Saint-Pierre's contestants (16–24s)      
|-
| – Jean Blaute's contestants (groups)     
|- 
| – Bottom two
|- 
| – Safe
|}

Season 2 (2008)
The second and final season aired in 2008. Dirk De Smet in the "Over 25" category and mentored by Kris Wauters won the title. Tom Dice who competed under his real name Tom Eeckhout was runner-up. The show was hosted by Hadise.

Key:
 – Winner
 – Runner-up
 – Third place

Results table 

Contestants' colour key:
{|
|-
| – Kris Wauter's contestants (over 25s)   
|-
| – Maurice Engelen's contestants (16–24s)      
|-
| – Do's contestants (groups)     
|- 
| – Bottom two
|- 
| – Safe
|-
| – Eliminated (no bottom two)
|}

Live show details

Week 1 (8 October 2008)

Judges' votes to eliminate
 Wauters: Lester & Abdou
 Do: Andy De Koker
 Engelen: Andy De Koker

Week 2 (15 October 2008)

Judges' votes to eliminate
 Do: Stefanie Schaekers
 Engelen: Miss Behave
 Wauters: Miss Behave

Week 3 (22 October 2008)

Judges' votes to eliminate
 Wauters: Rodwan Balkaïd
 Do: Karim Lequenne
 Engelen: Rodwan Balkaïd

Week 4 (29 October 2008)

Judges' votes to eliminate
 Do: Stefanie Schaekers
 Engelen: Lester & Abdou
 Wauters: Stefanie Schaekers

Week 5 (5 November 2008)

Judges' votes to eliminate
 Do: Elien Roosen
 Engelen: Jurgen De Jaegher
 Wauters: Jurgen De Jaegher

Week 6 (12 November 2008)

Judges' votes to eliminate
 Wauters: Lady-Like
 Do: Elien Roosen
 Engelen: Lady-Like

References

Belgium
Belgian music television shows
Television series by Fremantle (company)
2005 Belgian television series debuts
2008 Belgian television series endings
2000s Belgian television series
Belgian television series based on British television series
VTM (TV channel) original programming